Daotian may refer to:

 Daotian Station, Beijing, China
 Daotian, Shandong, China